Tesha Zohidovich Zohidov (Uzbek Cyrillic: Теша Зоҳидович Зоҳидов, Tisha Zakhidovich Zakhidov) was a Soviet-Uzbek zoologist, ecologist, and politician who served as president of the Academy of Sciences of the Uzbek SSR from 1952 to 1956.

Early life and education 
When he was only ten years old he began working at a print shop as an apprentice, although after the Soviet presence in the region increased he began attending a local school. After completing initial schooling in Kokand in 1924 he continued his education at the Tashkent Pedagogical College named after Narimonov, which he graduated from in 1926. That year, he entered Central Asia State University in 1926. Upon graduating from Central Asia State University in 1931, he became working for the Department of Vertebrate Zoology, where he worked as a researcher until 1949 when he became a professor. Back in 1939, he became a member of the Communist Party.

Career 
In 1943, the People's Commissariat of the Uzbek SSR asked the university to conduct a comprehensive survey of a Southeast portion of the Kyzylkum Desert. The project, dubbed the "South Kyzylkum Complex Expedition", was led by Yevgeny Korotin (working as a botanist) and Zohidov (working as a zoologist). The field work lasted from 15 March to 10 December 1943, and academic literature from the project was first published in 1945, although some works were not published until a decade later. Most of his works focused on vertebrates that lived in the dessert areas of the Uzbek SSR, especially in the Karakum Desert.

From 1946 to 1952 he served as deputy director of the Institute of Botany and Zoology of the Academy of Sciences of the Uzbek SSR. Meanwhile, he became a professor in 1949. In 1952 he became a member of the Academy of Sciences of the Uzbek SSR. That year, he became its president, a post he held until 1956. He then worked on zoology encyclopedia, for which he was awarded the Beruniy state prize in 1971.

He died on 21 August 1981 in Tashkent.

Awards 

 Order of Lenin

 Order of the October Revolution

 Three Order of the Red Banner of Labour

 Order of the Badge of Honour

References 

1906 births
1981 deaths
Recipients of the Order of Lenin
National University of Uzbekistan alumni
Fourth convocation members of the Supreme Soviet of the Soviet Union